English Township is one of eleven townships in Jersey County, Illinois, United States.  As of the 2010 census, its population was 487 and it contained 198 housing units.

Geography

Adjacent townships
 Kane Township, Greene County (northeast)
 Jersey Township (east)
 Mississippi Township (southeast)
 Otter Creek Township (south)
 Rosedale Township (southwest)
 Richwood Township (west)

Cemeteries
The township contains these twelve cemeteries: Armstrong, Belt Salem, Brown, Falkner, Grimes, Heitzig, Hetzel, Houseman, Lax, Rowden, Rusk and Saint Marys Catholic.

Major highways
  Illinois Route 16

Demographics

School districts
 Jersey Community Unit School District 100

Political districts
 Illinois' 17th congressional district
 State House District 97
 State Senate District 49

References
 
 United States Census Bureau 2007 TIGER/Line Shapefiles
 United States National Atlas

External links
 City-Data.com
 Illinois State Archives

Townships in Jersey County, Illinois
Townships in Illinois